The Bucknell Bison football team represents Bucknell University in college football at the NCAA Division I Football Championship Subdivision (formerly Division I-AA) level.  Bucknell is a member of the Patriot League.  Bucknell won the first Orange Bowl, 26–0, over the Miami Hurricanes on January 1, 1935.

History
The Bucknell football team was established in 1883 after a group of students from Lafayette College journeyed west to play a group of students from the University at Lewisburg, as Bucknell University was then called.  The Lewisburg students lost the game, 59–0, and did not play another game until 1887.  In 1918, Bucknell had its first of its three undefeated seasons.  On October 10, 1925, Bucknell played George Washington at home on the day that Christy Mathewson was buried in Lewisburg.  In his honor, there was no cheering in the first quarter. In 1931 Clarke Hinkle led Bucknell to a 6–0–3 record. In 1960, the team won its first Lambert Cup.  In 1989, the newly renovated Christy Mathewson–Memorial Stadium was renamed in Mathewson's honor.  In 1996, Bucknell won its first conference championship.  Bucknell football celebrated its seventh-straight winning season in 2001.

Classifications
1937: NCAA College Division
1938–1947: NCAA University Division
1948–1972: NCAA College Division
1973–1977: NCAA Division II
1978–present: NCAA Division I–AA/FCS

Conference memberships
1881–1957: Independent
1958–1969: Middle Atlantic States Collegiate Athletic Corporation
1970–1972: Independent
1973–1977: Division II Independent
1978–1985: Division I–AA Independent
1986–present: Patriot League

Individual award winners

College Football Hall of Fame

Pro Football Hall of Fame

Future non-conference opponents
Announced schedules as of January 1, 2022.

References

External links

 

 
American football teams established in 1883
1883 establishments in Pennsylvania